Nene is a feminine and masculine given name, surname and nickname in several cultures. 

In Spanish, it is generally a masculine term of endearment and an affectionate nickname meaning "baby". Alternative variations such as Neneh, Néné, Nené, Nenê and Nenè are used within Latin America, with Nenê being more common in Brazil. The feminine form of this nickname is Nena.

In Turkish and other Turkic languages such as Crimean Tatar, Nene means "grandmother", and is also generally used as a nickname for elderly women.

In Japanese, Nene is exclusively a feminine given name. It can be written as "ねね" and rarely "ネネ", or it can be written using different kanji characters and can mean:
, "shrine, mausoleum"
, "ancestral shrine, mausoleum, idol"
, "peaceful, tranquil"
, "sound, voice"
, "peaceful and tranquil child" (These kanji can also be read as Yasuko.)

People with this nickname or professional name
Female
 Néné (1834–1890), nickname of Duchess Helene in Bavaria
 Nene Hatun (1857–1955), Turkish folk heroine
 Nené Cascallar (1914–1982), pen name of late Argentine writer Alicia Inés Botto
 Nene Gare (1919–1994), professional name of late Australian writer and artist Doris Violet May Wadham
 Nene Go (born 1962), nickname of former Pilipino politician Ma. Catalina L. Loreto-Go 
 Nene (2000–2019), nickname of the late South African murder victim Uyinene Mrwetyana
Male
 Nenè (1917–2007), nickname of late Sicilian mafia boss Antonino Geraci
 Nene (1933–2019), nickname of the late Filipino politician and human rights lawyer Aquilino Pimentel Jr.
 Nené (born 1942), nickname of Brazilian footballer Claudio Olinto de Carvalho 
 Nene (born 1949), nickname of Peruvian footballer Teófilo Juan Cubillas Arizaga
 Nené (footballer, born 1949), nickname of Portuguese footballer Tamagnini Manuel Gomes Baptista
 Nené (born 1964), nickname of Equatoguinean-Spanish football manager and a former player José Antonio de la Ballina Avilés
 Nenê (born 1976), nickname of Brazilian women's footballer Elissandra Regina Cavalcanti
 Nené (footballer, born 1979) (born 1979), nickname of Cape Verdean footballer Adriano Barbosa Miranda da Luz
 Nenê (footballer, born 1981), nickname of Brazilian footballer Anderson Luiz de Carvalho
 Nenê (footballer, born 1983), nickname of Brazilian footballer Ânderson Miguel da Silva
 Nenê (born 1983), nickname of Brazilian futsal player João Carlos Gonçalves Filho
 Nenê (born 1992), nickname of Brazilian footballer Luis Otavio Bonilha de Oliveira
 Nené (footballer, born 1996), nickname of Mozambican footballer Feliciano João Jone

People with this given name
Female
 Kōdai-in, formerly known as Nene (ねね, 1546–1624), principal samurai wife of Toyotomi Hideyoshi
 Nene (禰々, 1528–1543), sister of Takeda Shingen, a pre-eminent daimyō in feudal Japan
 Nene (祢々, 1585-1644), Japanese noble lady, aristocrat and later daimyō
 Nene (音々), former member of Japanese heavy mental band Destrose
 Nene Hieda (稗田 寧々, born 1997), Japanese voice actress and singer 
 Nene Humphrey (born 1947), American installation artist  
 Nene Jitoe (地頭江 音々, born 2000), Japanese idol and member of HKT48
 Nene King (born 1943), American journalist 
 NeNe Leakes (born 1967), American actress
 Nene Ito (伊藤 寧々, born 1995), former member of Japanese idol group Nogizaka46
 Nene Otsuka (大塚 寧々, born 1968), Japanese actress
 Nene Sakai (酒井 寧子, born 1995), Japanese long track speed skater
 Nene Sakuragi (桜木 寧々), former member of Japanese idol group Houkago Princess
 Nene Sugisaki (杉﨑 寧々, born 1998), former member of Japanese idol group Sakura Gakuin
 Nene Tamayo (born 1981), Filipina reality television personality
 Nene Thomas (born 1968), American artist
 Nene Tomita (冨田 寧寧), Japanese-born Chinese volleyball player
 Nene Yokode (横出 寧々), Japanese model and former Miss Universe Japan 2017 contestant

Male
 Nene Amegatcher (born 1953), Ghanaian lawyer, academic and judge
 Nenê (born 1982), Brazilian basketball player who adopted it as his legal mononym
 Nene Macdonald (born 1995), Papua New Guinean rugby league footballer
 Nene Obianyo (born 1947), Nigerian paediatric surgeon

Fictional characters with the given name
 Nêne, title character of the 1920 novel Nêne by Ernest Pérochon
 Nenè, title character of the 1977 Italian film Nenè
 Nene Romanova in the anime series Bubblegum Crisis
 Nene in the video game and anime series Blue Dragon
 Nene, a playable character in the video game series Samurai Warriors
 Nene Sakurada in the anime series Crayon Shin-chan
 Nene Amano (天野 ネネ), a character in the anime series Digimon Fusion
 Nene Yashiro, the main female character of Toilet-Bound Hanako-kun
 Nene Kusanagi, from the mobile rhythm game Project Sekai: Colorful Stage! feat. Hatsune Miku
 Nene Kinokuni (紀ノ国 寧々), a character in the manga and anime series Food Wars!: Shokugeki no Soma
 Neneh, the title character of the 2022 French film Neneh Superstar

People with this surname
 Adriano Néné (born 1979), Cape Verde footballer
 Tāmati Wāka Nene (1785–1871), Māori chief
 Madhuri Dixit Nene, Indian actress
 Nhlanhla Nene (born 1958), former South African Minister of Finance

See also
 Nene (disambiguation)
 Nena (name)

Given names
Surnames
Nicknames
Japanese feminine given names